Anna Smith (born 14 August 1988) is a British former professional tennis player.

She won one doubles title on the WTA Tour, as well as five singles and 29 doubles titles on the ITF Women's Circuit.

Smith, who specialised in doubles, was coached by Dave Sammel at TeamBath.

Early and personal life
She was born in Redhill, Surrey, to Robert and Gunilla Smith and started playing tennis at the age of ten.

Career

Junior (2003–2006)
Smith first competed as a junior in February 2003 and her last junior tournament was in June 2006 in the qualifying draw for the Wimbledon juniors. She had limited success as a singles player; she reached only one final (in April 2006 at the Sutton ITF junior tournament where she was beaten by Naomi Broady) and did not reach the quarterfinals in any other tournament she played.

She had significantly more success as a junior doubles competitor, winning three titles at the Donnybrook Junior International, the Wrexham and the Nottingham ITF event. She also reached two more finals, four semifinals and one quarterfinal.

Over the three years of her junior career, she reached a career-high combined ranking of world No. 665 and accumulated win–loss records of 8–13 in singles and 24–10 in doubles.

2004–2007
Smith played her first professional match in July 2004, courtesy of a wildcard into the qualifying draw of the $10k tournament in Felixstowe, England. Following two wins, she lost in the final round of qualifying to Lena Keothavong, the younger sister of top-100 player Anne Keothavong. Smith then lost in the qualifying stages of the $10k tournament in Manchester before going to Bolton and winning two matches to qualify for the $10k tournament held there. In her first main draw match of her career, she lost to a fellow British Elizabeth Thomas. She finished 2004 without a world ranking.

In April 2005, Smith lost in the final round of qualifying for the $10k in Porto Santo, Portugal, but was given a chance in the main draw as a lucky loser. She played well in this tournament before having to withdraw in the quarterfinals. August brought two more quarterfinal losses for Smith, the first in the $10k Wrexham tournament and the second in the $10k Nottingham tournament. The Wrexham event also saw her claim her first professional title as she won the doubles in partnership with Rebecca Llewellyn. Her final tournament of the year was the $10k event in Sunderland, where she also reached the quarterfinals. She finished 2005 ranked world No. 660.

April and May 2006 saw good form from Smith; in April, she reached the first ITF Circuit semifinal of her career in Bath, Somerset and the following month she reached the quarterfinals in Bournemouth. In August, she reached the first singles final of her career in Ilkley, not dropping a single set en route. She was beaten in the title match by Anna Fitzpatrick. Smith managed to reach the quarterfinals as a qualifier in her very next tournament ($10k Wrexham). In September, she won her first professional singles title at the $10k event in Nottingham beating compatriot Georgie Stoop in the final. The rest of the year saw limited success for Smith in singles, though she did win a doubles title in Redbridge with Anna Hawkins.

In March 2007, Smith reached the third singles final of her career at a $10k event in Hamilton, New Zealand, where she lost to Erika Sema. She got no more notable results until August that year when she hit another good patch, reaching the semifinal of the $10k event in London before losing to Martina Babáková. Smith and Babáková also won the doubles in London. In her next tournament, a $10k event in Nottingham, Smith reached the final which she lost to Pauline Wong. She then immediately followed this up by qualifying for and reaching the quarterfinals of the $25k event, also held in Nottingham. The rest of the year was spent on the ITF Circuit but she lost before the quarterfinals in every tournament. Her end-of-year ranking was world No. 449.

2008
2008 started disappointingly for Smith as she only managed to reach one ITF quarterfinal before entering the qualifying event for Wimbledon where she won one match (against Julie Coin of France) before losing in the second round. Later that year she won the second ITF title of her career, this time at the $10k event in London. She beat Rebecca Marino in the final. She then reached the semifinals in Limoges, France – another $10k event. In October, she reached the quarterfinals of a $50k home event in Barnstaple before losing to Lina Stančiūtė. Her year-end ranking was 373.

2009
In her new season she won only one match out of her first eleven, before going on to take the title in Felixstowe in July, beating Heather Watson in the semifinals and Tímea Babos in the final. In her next tournament, another $10k in Frinton, she again came up against Watson in the semifinals but was defeated in straight sets. After this she reached only one more quarterfinal for the rest of the year in Koksijde where she lost to Sofia Shapatava. By the end of 2009, her singles ranking had fallen to No. 441.

2017
Smith won her first WTA Tour title when she and Nicole Melichar beat Kirsten Flipkens and Johanna Larsson in Nuremberg.

2018
In February, Smith was selected for the Fed Cup Europe/Africa Zone Group I matches in Estonia. Playing doubles with Katie Boulter, they won both of their dead pool rubbers against Estonia and Portugal. With Great Britain in the playoffs, Johanna Konta and Heather Watson won their singles matches against Hungary, Great Britain progressed to the World Group II Play-offs, and the doubles match was not played.

WTA career finals

Doubles: 6 (1 title, 5 runner-ups)

WTA 125 tournament finals

Doubles: 1 (runner-up)

ITF Circuit finals

Singles: 10 (5 titles, 5 runner–ups)

Doubles: 45 (29 titles, 16 runner–ups)

Grand Slam performance timeline

Doubles

Fed Cup participation
Great Britain Fed Cup team

Doubles (4–1)

References

External links
 
 
 
 
 Anna Smith at the Lawn Tennis Association

1988 births
Living people
British female tennis players
People from Redhill, Surrey
Tennis players at the 2010 Commonwealth Games
English female tennis players
Tennis people from Surrey
Commonwealth Games competitors for England